Maria Bueno and Darlene Hard were the defending champions, but Hard did not compete. Bueno partnered with Robyn Ebbern but lost in the semifinals to Billie Jean Moffitt and Karen Susman.

Margaret Smith and Lesley Turner defeated Moffitt and Susman in the final, 7–5, 6–2 to win the ladies' doubles tennis title at the 1964 Wimbledon Championships.

Seeds

  Margaret Smith /  Lesley Turner (champions)
  Billie Jean Moffitt /  Karen Susman (final)
  Maria Bueno /  Robyn Ebbern (semifinals)
  Renée Haygarth /  Ann Jones (semifinals)

Draw

Finals

Top half

Section 1

Section 2

Bottom half

Section 3

Section 4

References

External links

Women's Doubles
Wimbledon Championship by year – Women's doubles
Wimbledon Championships
Wimbledon Championships